"Love & Devotion" is a song by German Eurodance/pop music project Real McCoy (also known as M.C. Sar & The Real McCoy). Originally an album track featured on their second album, Space Invaders (1994), it was later released in Europe in 1995 as a Real McCoy single. For unknown reasons, it was not released in the US by Arista. It was produced in Germany by music producers Juergen Wind (J. Wind) and Frank Hassas (Quickmix) under the producer team name Freshline. The single peaked within the top 10 in Australia, Finland, Lithuania and Scotland, and reached number 11 in the UK.

Critical reception
AllMusic editor Bryan Buss named "Love & Devotion" a standout track from the album. James Richliano from The Boston Globe described it as "Spanish-flavoured". Annette M. Lai from the Gavin Report felt it has "hit potential". Ross Jones from The Guardian called it "pan-cultural disco". A reviewer for Lennox Herald remarked that the song "has shades of Ace of Base which probably means that it will be a hit." In his weekly UK chart commentary, James Masterton said, "For some reason the more laid-back tempo of "Love and Devotion" reminds me of the kind of record the DJ would put on at an open air disco in the middle of the continent in summer." Pan-European magazine Music & Media noted that musically, the Berlin duo "carries on with a reggae-styled Euro dance follow-up" to "Another Night". Music Week gave the song four out of five, stating that "moving into Ace Of Base Eurofied reggae territory, this is destined for the Top 10". James Hamilton from the RM Dance Update declared it as a "Ace Of Base-ish catchy Euro-reggae chugger".

Chart performance
"Love & Devotion" was a notable hit on the charts in Europe, reaching the top 10 in Finland, Lithuania and Scotland, peaking at number four, five and ten. Additionally, it was a top 20 hit in Austria (16), Belgium (12, Flanders), Ireland (16), Sweden (16) and the UK, as well as on the Eurochart Hot 100, where it reached number 19. In the UK, it peaked at number 11, in its first week on the UK Singles Chart on April 23, 1995. On the UK Dance Singles Chart, it reached number 14, while it peaked within the top 30 in the Netherlands (24) and the top 40 in Germany (37). 

Outside Europe, "Love & Devotion" was successful in Australia, peaking at number seven, while in New Zealand, it was a top 30 hit, reaching number 28.

Music video
A music video was produced to promote the song. Different people are seen sitting in a construction of two chairs put together with their backs to each other, that are spinning slowly around. In between, there are scenes featuring the band walking around in a city at night. Sometimes they are also seen sitting in the spinning chairs. The video was later published on Real McCoy's official YouTube channel in October 2006. It had generated almost four million views as of December 2022.

Official mixes and remixes
 CD single (74321 27270-2)	
"Love & Devotion" (Airplay Mix) – 3:54
"Love & Devotion" (Club Mix) – 4:43
"Love & Devotion" (Development Corporation Extended) – 5:41
"Another Night" (Radio Mix) – 3:57

 CD maxi (74321 26377 2)		
"Love & Devotion" (Airplay Mix) – 3:55	
"Love & Devotion" (UK Airplay Mix) – 3:57	
"Love & Devotion" (Club Mix) – 4:33	
"Love & Devotion" (Extended UK Mix) – 5:42	
"Love & Devotion" (Summer Mix) – 5:32	
"Love & Devotion" (House Mix) – 5:50

Charts

References

1995 singles
Real McCoy (band) songs
1995 songs
Arista Records singles
English-language German songs